Edgewood, also known as Edgewood Plantation, is a historic house near Natchez, Adams County, Mississippi.

History
It was designed in the Italianate architectural style by New Orleans architects Howard & Diettel and was built by contractor Thomas Rose.  It is a south-facing house two stories tall at the front and three stores at the rear.  It has two-story service wings on both sides.  It has a hipped roof with an overhang supported by paired brackets.

It has a dark pink facade.

It has been listed on the National Register of Historic Places since 1979.

References

Houses on the National Register of Historic Places in Mississippi
Houses in Natchez, Mississippi
Italianate architecture in Mississippi
National Register of Historic Places in Natchez, Mississippi